The Holborn 9100 was a personal computer introduced in 1981 by a small Dutch company called Holborn, designed by H.A. Polak. Very few of these devices were sold with Holborn going into bankruptcy on the 27 April 1983. 

The 9100 base module is a server, and 9120 is a terminal.

Peripherals 
 30MB Hard Disk drive
 Light pen

References

External links 
 "history of computer design", inexhibit
 "Holborn 9100", old-computers.com
  "Holborn Computers", zigbeedomotica.nl

Word processors